This is a list of the National Collegiate Athletic Association (NCAA) men's basketball Final Four results. The list includes NCAA men's basketball games played under the Final Four format since the 1997 season, the year the format was instituted.

The results include one-game playoffs where teams tied after the group stage for a Final Four berth played an extra game to determine which team clinches the higher seed in the playoffs.

Since the NCAA is not a home-and-away league, the position of season host rotates among member universities, and the host pays for the arena rental and other facilities. Since the 2004 season, most Final Four games are held at the Araneta Coliseum in Quezon City, the Philippines largest indoor arena, unless the Big Dome is unavailable.

The league uses a modified Shaughnessy playoff system: the top four teams enter the playoffs, while the top two seeds are given the "twice-to-beat" advantage, that is, in order for them to be eliminated in the semifinals, they have to be beaten twice by the No. 3 and No. 4 seed, with them needing to win only once in order to advance. The winners in the semifinals dispute the championship trophy in a best-of-three series.

In its institution in 1997, if a team wins all of its group stage games (the "sweep"), the sweeping team advances outright to the finals possessing the twice-to-beat advantage, while the No. 3 and No. 4 seeds figure in a playoff to face the No. 2 seed. In 1997, the San Sebastian Stags swept the group stages, earning a finals berth and a twice-to-beat advantage. After the San Sebastian juniors team swept the group stage in 2008, the twice-to-beat incentive was dropped and the finals was turned into a best-of-three series. When the San Beda seniors team swept the group stage in 2010, the No. 1 seed has a thrice to beat advantage in the finals, while the opponent has to be beaten twice to be defeated.

Results
For the semifinal columns, the No. 1 vs. No. 4 matchup is given first.

Notes

See also
UAAP Final Four
List of UAAP Final Four results

References

NCAA Basketball Championship (Philippines)